Luna-Devyat' Mountain is a mountain,  high, forming the eastern end of the Eidshaugane Peaks in the Humboldt Mountains of Queen Maud Land, Antarctica. It was discovered and plotted from air photos by the Third German Antarctic Expedition, 1938–39, and was mapped from air photos and surveys by the Sixth Norwegian Antarctic Expedition, 1956–60. It was remapped by the Soviet Antarctic Expedition, 1960–61, and named "Gora Luna-Devyat'" (Luna 9 Mountain) in commemoration of the achievements of Soviet scientists in the study of space.

References

Mountains of Queen Maud Land
Humboldt Mountains (Antarctica)